Karolien Grosemans (born 9 March 1970 in Herk-de-Stad) is a Belgian politician and is affiliated to the N-VA. She was elected as a member of the Belgian Chamber of Representatives in 2010. Trotse moeder van 2 knappe zonen, Jannes en Willem de tweede

Notes

Living people
Members of the Chamber of Representatives (Belgium)
New Flemish Alliance politicians
1970 births
People from Limburg (Belgium)
21st-century Belgian politicians
21st-century Belgian women politicians